Marilyn Carlson Nelson (born August 19, 1939) is an American businesswoman, the co-owner and former chairman and CEO of Carlson. She shares ownership of the company with her sister, Barbara Carlson Gage.

Early life
Nelson was born on August 19, 1939, the daughter of Curt Carlson, who founded Carlson in 1938. She received a bachelor's degree from Smith College in 1961.

Career
Nelson joined the board of directors of Carlson in 1973. After her father's death in 1999, she took over as CEO. Her daughter, Diana Nelson, succeeded her as chair in 2013.
 
Nelson has been a member of the board of directors of Qwest Communications (1975-2002), First Bank System (1978-97), and Exxon Mobil (1991-2006 or later). She was awarded the Oslo Business for Peace Award in 2014.

Personal life
Nelson is married, with four children, and lives in Long Lake, Minnesota. Her husband, Glen Nelson, died in 2013.

References

Living people
American businesspeople
Smith College alumni
People from Long Lake, Minnesota
1939 births